is a district of Chiyoda, Tokyo, Japan, consisting of four chōme. It was a part of the former ward of Kōjimachi. As of March 1, 2007, its population is 1,404. Kudankita is a luxury and prestigious residential and business zone.

The Yasukuni Shrine is situated near the center of the district.

The Kudanshita district is located on the northwestern part of the ward of Chiyoda and borders Ichigayatamachi, Shinjuku. It also borders Nishi-Kanda and Kanda-Jinbōchō to the east, Kudanminami and Kitanomaru Kōen to the south, and Fujimi and Iidabashi to the north.

Economy
Tecmo had its headquarters in Kudankita. The construction company, Nakano Corporation, is also headquartered in the district.

District

Kudankita 1-chōme

Wako Kudan Junior & Senior High School
Tokyo University of Science Kudan Campus
Kitanomaru Square
Jissen Rinri Kōseikai
The Japan Society of Applied Physics

Kudanminami 2, 3 and 4 are part of the Banchō area.

Kudankita 2-chōme

Yasukuni Shrine
Tokyo Metropolitan Kudan Senior High School
Shirayuri Gakuen
Katsuo Maguro Kaikan

Kudankita 3-chōme
Yasukuni Shrine
Miwada Gakuen
Hosei University

Kudankita 4-chōme
Sekai Bunka Publishing
Sotobori Kōen

Education

 operates public elementary and junior high schools. Fujimi Elementary School (富士見小学校) is the zoned elementary school for Kudankita 1-2 chōme while Kudan Elementary School (千代田区立九段小学校) is the zoned elementary school for Kudankita 3-4 chōme. There is a freedom of choice system for junior high schools in Chiyoda Ward, and so there are no specific junior high school zones.

Chiyoda Ward operates , a junior-senior high school, in Kudankita.

References

Districts of Chiyoda, Tokyo